The discography of Pop Evil, an American hard rock band, consists of six studio albums, one extended play, twenty-three singles, two promotional singles and twenty-one music videos.

Studio albums

Extended plays

Singles

Promotional singles

Music videos

Notes

References

External links
Official website
Pop Evil at AllMusic

Rock music group discographies
Discographies of American artists